Lower Ballinderry (from Irish: Baile an Doire, meaning "townland of the oak grove") is a small village to the west of Upper Ballinderry in County Antrim, Northern Ireland. It is within the townland and civil parish of Ballinderry and the historic barony of Massereene Upper. The village lies a short distance to the southeast of Portmore Lough (a.k.a. In the 2001 census it had a population of 441.

The village sits at a crossroads that linked the medieval church site of Aghagallon (Ballinderry Old Graveyard), and later to the Plantation site of Portmore Castle. The village has at its core Ballinderry Moravian Church, a listed building, which, along with other listed structures, forms a distinct core to the settlement around the crossroads. It has a pre-eminently 18th century character, visible in buildings, in form and layout, and in the lime tree plantings.

The local primary school is Lower Ballinderry Primary School. There is an Ulsterbus service between Lower Ballinderry and Lisburn.

See also 
List of towns and villages in Northern Ireland
Upper Ballinderry

References 

NI Neighbourhood Information System

External links 
History of Ballinderry Moravian Church

Villages in County Antrim
Settlements in the British Province of the Moravian Church
Civil parish of Ballinderry (Massereene Upper)